William F. Conway (November 28, 1861 – December 18, 1943) was a backup catcher in Major League Baseball. He was born in Lowell, Massachusetts. 
 
 
In a two-season career, Conway was a .111 hitter (2-for-18) with four runs and three RBI without extrabases.

Despite appearing in just eight games, Conway eventually saved himself from baseball anonymity when he made battery with his younger brother, Dick Conway, to form one of 16 pitcher/catcher combinations of brothers in major league history. On August 22, 1886, the Conway brothers appeared in one game while playing for Baltimore.

Following his playing retirement, Conway worked as an engraver at the Middlesex Bleachery in Somerville, Massachusetts, where he died at the age of 82.

See also
1884 Philadelphia Quakers season
1886 Baltimore Orioles season

External links
Baseball Reference
Retrosheet
SABR project
Brother Batteries

Baltimore Orioles (AA) players
Philadelphia Quakers players
19th-century baseball players
Major League Baseball catchers
Baseball players from Massachusetts
1861 births
1943 deaths
Jersey City Skeeters players
Haverhill (minor league baseball) players
Lawrence (minor league baseball) players
Portland (minor league baseball) players
Salem (minor league baseball) players
San Antonio Missionaries players
San Antonio Cowboys players